Calamotropha aureliellus is a species of moth in the family Crambidae. It is found in France, Switzerland, Austria, Italy, Germany, Poland, the Czech Republic, Slovakia, Hungary, Romania, Bulgaria, the Republic of Macedonia, Greece, the Russian Far East and Japan.

The wingspan is about 23 mm.

Subspecies
Calamotropha aureliellus aureliella (Europe, Russian Far East, Japan)
Calamotropha aureliellus korbi (Caradja, 1910) (Amur)
Calamotropha aureliellus kikuchii Okano, 1960 (Japan: northern Honshu)

References

Moths described in 1841
Crambinae
Moths of Asia
Moths of Europe
Taxa named by Josef Emanuel Fischer von Röslerstamm